The Viña del Mar International Film Festival (Spanish: Festival Internacional de Cine de Viña del Mar, FICVIÑA) is a Latin American film festival held annually in Viña del Mar, Chile.

History
 
 
The idea for a Chilean film festival was born in 1962, when the Viña del Mar Film Club was created by a group of film aficionados. In 1963 the first Amateur Film Festival was held, and the following year the festival opened to films from the Latin American region. This festival dropped the “amateur” to become Chile’s first international film festival in 1967, inaugurated by Aldo Francia.

Between 1970 and 2000, the festival was suspended due to the political climate in Chile. In 2007, the festival celebrated its 40th anniversary. The festival became free for visitors in 2012 and 2014, Mexico was the invited guest.

Award
Awards for the festival are the Paoa, a statue made of wood from the Pou tree native to Easter Island. The statues have two heads, representing the duality of day and night. Each statue is made by hand by Miguel Nahoe and no two are identical.

The official competition of the festival is divided into the following categories:

 International Feature Film Competition
 International Documentary Competition
 International Short Film Competition
 International Animated Short Film Competition
 National Short Film Competition
 Regional Documentary Competition 
 Short Film Competition for National Film Schools
 Documentary Competition for  National Film School
 Work in Progress
 Competition for Best Film Soundtrack

Gran Paoa Prize Winners- Best International Film

See also
Valdivia International Film Festival
Santiago International Film Festival
Cinema of Chile

External links 
Viña del Mar International Film Festival official website

References

Film festivals in Chile